Galefele Moroko (born 16 April 1997) is a Botswana sprinter. She competed in the women's 4 × 400 metres relay at the 2017 World Championships in Athletics. She qualified to represent Botswana at the 2020 Summer Olympics.

References

External links
 

1997 births
Living people
Botswana female sprinters
World Athletics Championships athletes for Botswana
Place of birth missing (living people)
Commonwealth Games medallists in athletics
Commonwealth Games bronze medallists for Botswana
Athletes (track and field) at the 2018 Commonwealth Games
Athletes (track and field) at the 2019 African Games
African Games medalists in athletics (track and field)
African Games gold medalists for Botswana
African Games gold medalists in athletics (track and field)
Athletes (track and field) at the 2020 Summer Olympics
Olympic athletes of Botswana
Olympic female sprinters
Medallists at the 2018 Commonwealth Games